Chromium carbonyl, also known as chromium hexacarbonyl, is the chemical compound with the formula Cr(CO)6.  At room temperature the solid is stable to air, although it does have a high vapor pressure and sublimes readily.  Cr(CO)6 is zerovalent, meaning that Cr has an oxidation state of zero, and it is a homoleptic complex, which means that all the ligands are identical. The complex is octahedral with Cr–C and C–O distances of 1.91 and 1.14 Å, respectively.

History
The synthesis of Cr(CO)6 was described in a series of papers published in 1926–7. The procedure involves treatment of Cr(III) salts with high pressures of carbon monoxide using phenyl magnesium bromide as a reductant.

Reactions

Pentacarbonyl derivatives
When heated or UV-irradiated in tetrahydrofuran (THF) solution, Cr(CO)6 converts to Cr(CO)5(THF) with loss of one CO ligand. The THF ligand is readily displaced.  Often the THF complex is generated and used in situ.

UV-irradiation of frozen solutions of chromium hexacarbonyl affords a variety of labile adducts, including labile but complexes with some noble gases.

Arene derivatives
Heating a solution of Cr(CO)6 in an aromatic solvent results in replacement of three CO ligands.  The reactions are especially favorable for electron-rich arenes:
Cr(CO)6 + C6H5R → Cr(CO)3(C6H5R) + 3 CO
The products are "piano stool complexes". These species are typically yellow solids. One example is (benzene)chromium tricarbonyl.

Fischer carbenes and carbynes
Alkyl and aryl organolithium reagents (RLi) add to Cr(CO)6 to give anionic acyl complexes.  These anionic species in turn react with alkylating agents such as Me3O+ to form (OC)5Cr=C(OMe)R to give Fischer carbene complexes:

Cyclopentadienyl derivatives
Treatment of chromium hexacarbonyl with sodium cyclopentadienide gives NaCr(CO)3(C5H5). Oxidation of this salt affords cyclopentadienylchromium tricarbonyl dimer (Cp2Cr2(CO)6).  This complex is distinctive because it exists in measureable equilibrium with the monometallic Cr(I) radical CpCr(CO)3.

Safety
In common with many of the other homoleptic metal carbonyls (e.g. nickel carbonyl and iron carbonyl), chromium hexacarbonyl is toxic and thought to be carcinogenic. Its vapor pressure is relatively high for a metal complex,  at 36 °C).

References

External links
 National Pollutant Inventory - Chromium (III) and compounds fact sheet

Carbonyl complexes
Chromium complexes
Organochromium compounds
Octahedral compounds